Yunesabad or Yunosabad may refer to:

Yunesabad, Kurdistan
Yunesabad, Qazvin
Yunesabad, Semnan
Yunesabad, Sistan and Baluchestan